Super-Patriot may refer to:

Super-Patriot, several Marvel Comics characters:
Patric List, an alias given by the original Super-Patriot
John Walker, now known under the moniker of U.S. Agent
Kate Walker, the sister of John Walker
SuperPatriot, an Image Comics character created by Erik Larsen